IperEspresso is a single-serve capsule system for preparing espresso coffee and espresso-based drinks. It was developed and patented by Illy.

IperEspresso capsule encloses a complete extraction group that replaces the traditional process of percolation with a two-stage extraction. In the first stage, iper-infusion, hot water under pressure creates conditions that extract coffee flavor and aroma and increase richness and complexity. In the second stage, emulsification, the iper-infusion is forced through the valve at the bottom of the capsule, mixing the aromatic oils with air to produce cream.

Machines 
IperEspresso capsules require special espresso machines. They are manufactured by FrancisFrancis! (a subsidiary of Illy), Gaggia (Saeco), and Cuisinart (Conair).

In addition to home espresso machines, Illy offers professional FrancisFrancis! X2.1 IperEspresso machines for hotels and restaurants.

Capsules 
IperEspresso capsules are manufactured only by Illy. The cost per serving is 10% higher than Illy E.S.E pods, and twice higher than Illy ground or whole bean non-encapsulated coffee. Each capsule contains approximately 7 grams of coffee.

Illy nominally offers three roast variations: normal, dark roast, and decaffeinated. It also offers Lungo, medium roast capsules that produce a longer (higher proportion of water) espresso, and the Monoarabica line, single-origin Arabica beans from six countries: Brazil, Guatemala, Ethiopia, Colombia, Costa Rica, and India. Seasonally, the company offers Idillyum, a low-caffeine Arabica grown in El Salvador.

References

External links
 

Espresso machines
Single-serving coffee makers
Coffee in Italy
Illycaffè
Italian inventions